The 1992 Winter Olympics, officially known as the XVI Olympic Winter Games and commonly known as Albertville '92 (Arpitan: Arbèrtvile '92), was a winter multi-sport event held from 8 to 23 February 1992 in and around Albertville, France. Albertville won the bid to host the Winter Olympics in 1986, beating Sofia, Falun, Lillehammer, Cortina d'Ampezzo, Anchorage, and Berchtesgaden. The 1992 Winter Olympics were the last winter games held in the same year as the Summer Olympics. The Games were the fifth Olympic Games held in France and the country's third Winter Olympics, after the 1924 Winter Games in Chamonix and the 1968 Winter Games in Grenoble. This games was the first of two consecutive Olympic games to be held in Western Europe, preceding the 1992 Summer Olympics in Barcelona, Spain.

18 events in Figure skating, short track speed skating, speed skating, and the opening and closing ceremonies took place in Albertville. The 39 other events were held in the nearby 9 villages and resorts around Savoie: Courchevel, La Plagne, Les Arcs, Les Menuires, Les Saisies, Méribel, Pralognan-la-Vanoise, Tignes, and Val d'Isère. Sixty-four National Olympic Committees and 1,801 athletes participated in six sports and fifty-seven events. This included both the Unified Team, representing the non-Baltic former Soviet republics, and Germany, newly consolidated again as a team following the reunification of the former East and West Germany in 1990. The event also saw the debut of eight nations in the Winter Olympics. New events included Short track speed skating, freestyle skiing, and women's biathlon. These were the last Winter Olympics to include demonstration sports, consisting of curling, aerials and ski ballet, and speed skiing, and the last Games to feature an outdoor speed skating rink.

Host city selection

A record-breaking seven locations bid for the games. The non-winning bids were from Anchorage, Berchtesgaden, Cortina d'Ampezzo, Falun, Lillehammer, and Sofia. The 91st IOC Session, held in Lausanne on 17 October 1986, voted Albertville the host of the Games.

Opening ceremony

Highlights
Bjørn Dæhlie and Vegard Ulvang dominated the men's cross-country skiing races, both taking home three gold medals with Norway taking a medal sweep in the event. 16-year-old Ski jumper Toni Nieminen became the youngest male gold medalist in a Winter Olympic event. Petra Kronberger won both the combined event and the slalom of alpine skiing, while Bonnie Blair won both the 500 m and 1000 m speed skating events, and Gunda Niemann took both of the longest races.

Three National Olympic Committees won a medal for the first time at the Winter Olympics (all Pacific Ocean littoral states; one in a sport making its debut at the Games, short track speed skating). Kim Ki-hoon's gold medal in 1000 m short track speed skating signified South Korea's first medal in the Winter Olympics, while Ye Qiaobo's silver medal in women's 500 m speed skating represented China's first Winter Olympics medal. Annelise Coberger from New Zealand became the first Oceanian athlete to win a medal in women's alpine skiing slalom, making her the first athlete from the southern hemisphere to mount the podium at the Winter Games.

Swiss speed skier Nicolas Bochatay died on the penultimate day of the Games, when he crashed into a snow-grooming vehicle during a training run.

Legacy
The 1992 Olympic Winter Games marked the last time both the Winter and Summer games were held in the same year. The 1992 Olympics also marked the last time France hosted the Olympics. The games are scheduled to return to France in 2024 when Paris is set to become the second city to host the Summer Olympics three times.

Cost and cost overrun
The Oxford Olympics Study established the outturn cost of the Albertville 1992 Winter Olympics at US$2.0 billion (in 2015-dollars) and cost overrun at 137% in real terms. This includes sports-related costs only, that is: (i) operational costs incurred by the organizing committee to stage the Games, e.g., expenditures for technology, transportation, workforce, administration, security, catering, ceremonies, and medical services; and (ii) direct capital costs incurred by the host city and country or private investors to build, e.g., the competition venues, the Olympic village, international broadcast center, and media and press center, which are required to host the Games. Indirect capital costs were not included, e.g. road, rail, or airport infrastructure, or hotel upgrades or other business investment incurred in preparation for the Games but not directly related to their staging.  In comparison, the cost and cost overrun of the 2010 Vancouver Winter Olympics were US$2.5 billion and 13%, respectively, while the 2014 Sochi Winter Olympics (the most costly Olympics to date) had costs and cost overrun at US$51 billion and 289%, respectively. The average cost for the Winter Games since 1960 is US$3.1 billion, while the average cost overrun is 142%.

Mascot 

The 1992 Winter Games mascot, Magique (Magic), was a small imp in the shape of a star and a cube. The mascot was created by Philippe Mairesse and replaced the original mascot, which was a mountain goat. The star shape symbolized dreams and imagination, while the mascot's red and blue colors originated from the French flag.

Sports
There were 57 events contested in 6 sports (12 disciplines). See the medal winners, ordered by sport:

Demonstration sports
This was the last time demonstration events were included in the Winter Olympics program. Of the 8 events that were under evaluation, 4 received the endorsement to be included in an official form in future editions of the Games (Curling tournaments and the aerials events on the freestyle skiing). The other four events (speed skiing and skiing ballet events on the freestyle skiing) were rejected and have not since returned.

 Curling – Was an official sport in the Olympic program in 1924 after which it was a demonstration sport twice, in 1932 and 1988. There was a possibility of re-inclusion in Lillehammer 1994 but the return as an official sport was postponed to Nagano 1998.
 Freestyle skiing – Like curling, it was a demonstration sport four years previously before becoming part of the official program. Only moguls skiing received this status, while aerials and ballet remained demonstration events. Aerials became an official event two years later, while ballet skiing appeared in the games for the last time, going into a progressive decline and losing its status as a competitive discipline by the International Ski Federation (FIS) in 2000.
 Speed skiing – Considered one of the most dangerous events in the sporting world, the event won a chance to be evaluated by the members of the International Olympic Committee and the FIS, with the possibility of appearing in the program of a future edition. However, this possibility was extinguished when Swiss skier Nicolas Bochatay ran into a snow-grooming vehicle during a training run, dying immediately. His death is the subject of several controversies, as speed skiing was not a part of the official program. After this incident, the sport was excluded from any evaluation for future additions to the Olympic program.

Participating nations

Sixty-four nations sent competitors to the 1992 Olympics, including seven nations making their first appearance at a Winter Olympics. Following the collapse of the Soviet Union in 1991, six former-Soviet bloc nations chose to form a Unified Team, while the Baltic states of Estonia, Latvia and Lithuania competed as independent nations for the first time since 1936. United Nations Security Council Resolution 757 took effect on 30 May 1992 (97 days after the closing ceremonies), and Yugoslav athletes were able to participate under their country's national symbols. It also suspended the activities of the Yugoslav Olympic Committee, making the country's athletes ineligible to compete on the 1992 Summer Olympics. Despite this, some of their athletes classified in individual sports and gained authorization to compete as Independent Olympic Participants (which also happened at the 1992 Summer Paralympics). Yugoslav athletes returned to the Olympic Games in the 1996 Summer Olympics, when only Serbia, Montenegro and Kosovo were still part of the country. The 1992 Winter Olympics were the first time since the 1964 Summer Olympics that Germany competed with a unified team. Seven National Olympic Committees sent their first delegations to the Winter Olympics: Algeria, Bermuda, Brazil, Honduras, Ireland, Swaziland, Croatia, and Slovenia (the last two making their first appearances at any Olympics, just a few months after their respective declarations of independence from Yugoslavia). Through the 2022 Winter Olympics, this has been the only participation of Swaziland and Honduras in an edition of the Winter Olympics.

Venues

The 1992 Games are the last (as of 2023) in which the speed skating venue was outdoors.
Albertville
Halle Olympique – Figure skating and short-track speed skating
L'anneau de vitesse – Speed skating
Théâtre des Cérémonies – Ceremonies (opening & closing)
Les Arcs – Speed skiing
Courchevel – Ski jumping and Nordic combined
Les Ménuires – Alpine skiing (slalom men)
Méribel – Alpine skiing (women)
Méribel Ice Palace – Ice hockey
La Plagne – Bobsleigh and luge
Pralognan-la-Vanoise – Curling
Les Saisies – Biathlon, cross-country skiing
Tignes – Freestyle skiing
Val d'Isère – Alpine skiing (men combined, downhill, giant slalom, and super-giant slalom)

Medal table 

(Host nation is highlighted.)

(1 combined team with athletes from 6 nations of the Commonwealth of Independent States; the team only appeared in these Winter Olympics)

Podium sweeps

Schedule

See also

Notes
Notes

Citations

External links 

 Olympic Review – Official Results
 The program of the 1992 Albertville Winter Olympics

 
 1992
Winter Olympics 1992
1992
Winter Olympics
Winter Olympics
Winter Olympics
Olympics 1992